B R Vijay Kumar, who is professionally known as Duniya Vijay and Duniya Viji, is an Indian actor who appears in Kannada films. He began his career playing small roles until he got his big break in Duniya (2007). He is noted for his performances in Chanda (2007), Junglee (2009), Johny Mera Naam Preethi Mera Kaam (2011) and Jayammana Maga (2013).

Career

Vijay began his career in films with a role in Yograj Bhat's Ranga SSLC with Sudeep. He then appeared in Jogi, Shree and Ee Rajeev Gandhi Alla, and also accepted roles in television.

The turning point in Vijay's career came with his friend Soori's directorial debut Duniya. Vijay was cast as a kind, naive village boy who falls into the hands of underworld goons who use him as a henchman. His acting won him positive reviews from critics. Vijay went on to win the State and Filmfare awards for his role in the film.

In 2007, Vijay appeared in Yuga, Chanda and Geleya. Yuga is an action-oriented film that is similar to Duniya but it was not a box-office success. Vijay took a supporting role in Geleya when Prakash Rai suddenly left the film.

In Chanda, which was directed by S. Narayan, who had supposedly agreed with Vijay to release the film six weeks after Yuga to avoid a clash. Narayan did not keep this promise, for which Vijay refused to dub for the film. The matter was settled with the Karnataka Film Chamber of Commerce (KFCC), which imposed a year-long ban on Vijay. After the intervention of KFCC elders, the ban was revoked and Vijay was eligible to work on other movies. Chanda was a commercial success at the box office, and especially at B&C centres.

Vijay did a semi-art film Avva for Kavita Lankesh at the start of 2008. Vijay won accolades for a bravura performance, but the film did not do well. He was then seen in Sumana Kittur's Slum Bala towards the end of 2008, which also did average business. The consensus was that both films lacked action, which was Vijay's forte.

In 2009, Vijay appeared in action-oriented films, such as MR Ramesh's Thaakath and Junglee, which were directed by Soori, and Sadhu Kokila's Devru. Vijar appeared in three films in 2010, one of which, Kanteerava, had average business and reviews. The other two, Shankar IPS and Kari Chirathe, were box-office failures. The following year, he appeared in successful and critically acclaimed films Jarasandha, Johny Mera Naam Preethi Mera Kaam and Veerabahu.

In 2012, Vijay starred in the critically acclaimed Bheema Theeradalli which also had commercial success. Vijay was lauded for his performance in the movie.  In early 2013, the film Rajanikantha was released and it was a disaster at the box office. His subsequent release Jayammana Maga, a psychological thriller and his first production venture under his company "Duniya Talkies", attracted positive critical reviews and his performance was noted. His next movie Shivajinagara was an average box-office performer. In 2014, his only movie was Simhadri. In 2015, he appeared in Jackson, Rx Suri, and Ring Road, which were hits, but Cobra was delayed.

In 2016, Vijay's first release was Yogaraj Bhat's much-hyped film Dana Kayonu, in which he starred alongside Priyamani. The film was a commercial success and resurrected his career. His next release was Nagashekar's Masti Gudi, which made little impact at the box office.

The film Kanaka was released after Masti Gudi. After the film's success he appeared in Johnny Johnny Yes Papa (2018), a sequel to their previous venture Johny Mera Naam Preethi Mera Kaam (2011) that was produced under Vijay's company Duniya Talkies.

In 2021, Vijay appeared in the adult-oriented film Kusti with his son, and his own directorial debut Salaga.

Controversies

On 6 November 2016, while filming the climax fight scene for Masti Gudi, two stuntmen playing the villains Anil and Uday, along with Vijay, jumped from a helicopter into Thippagondanahalli Reservoir. While the two stuntmen drowned, Vijay was rescued by the film crew. Following this incident, the KFCC imposed a ban on Vijay, director Nagashekar and stunt choreographer Ravi Varma until further notice. In April 2017, police filed criminal charges against several members of the production crew but did not file charges against Vijay.
	
On 24 September 2018, Vijay was arrested after he was alleged to have assaulted and abducted his friend, a gym trainer.

Filmography

References

External links
 Duniya attracts Vijay too
 An interview with Vijay in Thats Kannada
 

1974 births
Living people
Indian male film actors
Male actors in Kannada cinema
Filmfare Awards South winners
Kannada film producers
Kannada male actors
Male actors from Bangalore
Film producers from Bangalore
21st-century Indian male actors